Revaz Mindorashvili (born July 1, 1976) is a Georgian wrestler, who has won a gold medal at the 2008 Summer Olympics.

References
The Official Website of the Beijing 2008 Olympic Games

External links
 

1976 births
Male sport wrestlers from Georgia (country)
Olympic wrestlers of Georgia (country)
Wrestlers at the 2004 Summer Olympics
Wrestlers at the 2008 Summer Olympics
Olympic gold medalists for Georgia (country)
Living people
Olympic medalists in wrestling
Medalists at the 2008 Summer Olympics
World Wrestling Championships medalists

Recipients of the Presidential Order of Excellence
European Wrestling Championships medalists